Ciaran Berry (born 1971 Dublin) is an Irish-American poet.

Life
He grew up in Carna, County Galway and Falcarragh, County Donegal.

He graduated from New York University, a New York Times Fellow.
He teaches at Trinity College, Hartford.

His work appeared in Gulf Coast, AGNI, Crazyhorse, The Missouri Review,
The Threepenny Review, Gettysburg Review, Green Mountains Review, Ontario Review, and Notre Dame Review.

Awards
 2007 Crab Orchard Award
 Jerwood Aldeburgh first collection prize
2012 Whiting Award

Bibliography

Poetry

Collections

List of poems

Critical studies and reviews of Berry's work
 Review of The dead zoo.

References

External links
 "An Interview with Ciaran Berry", Andrew McFadyen-Ketchum
Profile at The Whiting Foundation

1971 births
Living people
American male poets
Irish poets
New York University alumni
New York University faculty
People from County Donegal
People from County Galway
Irish emigrants to the United States
21st-century American poets
21st-century American male writers